{{safesubst:#invoke:RfD||2=Boris Pecker|month = March
|day = 10
|year = 2023
|time = 12:48
|timestamp = 20230310124851

|content=
REDIRECT Dead Famous (novel)

}}